Aleksei Goncharov may refer to:

 Aleksei Fyodorovich Goncharov (1879 - 1913), Russian chess player
 Aleksei Vladimirovich Goncharov (b. 1988), Russian footballer
 Alexei Goncearov (b. 1984), Moldovan footballer